(Swedish for "the farmers") is a Swedish agricultural cooperative. Owned by 19,000 Swedish farmers, they have 10,000 employees, operations in over 20 countries and an annual turnover of SEK 50 billion (approximately EUR 5 billion).

The cooperative owns several food brands, such as AXA and Kungsörnen.

See also
Kungsörnen

References

External links
 
Lantmannen.com (Official site)
Lantmannen Cerealia
Lantmannen Lantbruk

Agricultural cooperatives
Agricultural organizations based in Sweden
Food and drink companies of Sweden
Cooperatives in Sweden